Robert Vessey may refer to:

 Robert Vessey (Canadian politician), member of the Legislative Assembly of Prince Edward Island
 Robert S. Vessey (1858–1929), governor of South Dakota